Michael Pearce may refer to:

 Michael Pearce (author) (born 1933), Anglo-Egyptian Sudan author
 Michael Pearce (artist) (born 1965), British, California-based artist
 Mickey Pearce, character in Only Fools and Horses

See also
Mike Pearse, cartoonist
Mike Pierce (born 1980), American mixed martial arts fighter
Mick Pearce (born 1938), Zimbabwean architect